A protostar is a very young star that is still gathering mass from its parent molecular cloud.

Protostar(s) may also refer to:

 ProtoStar, a short-lived satellite company (2006–2009)
 Protostar (EP), a 2020 EP by JO1
 Protostar: War on the Frontier, a 1993 science fiction video game
 Protostars (book), a 1971 science fiction anthology
 USS Protostar, a fictional Starfleet ship from the science fiction series Star Trek: Prodigy